Interstate 12 (I-12) is an Interstate Highway located entirely within the US state of Louisiana. Along the way, it passes through the city of Hammond, where it intersects I-55 and US Route 51 (US 51). It also serves the cities of Ponchatoula and Denham Springs, as well as the St. Tammany Parish cities of Covington and Mandeville. Skirting the northern shore of Lake Pontchartrain, I-12 serves as both a northern bypass of the New Orleans metropolitan area and an alternate route for I-10, which serves the city of New Orleans itself.

I-12 parallels the older US 190 corridor and traverses the North Shore of Lake Pontchartrain in the southeastern portion of the state. The Interstate's length is short for a mainline Interstate and is comparable with the country's longest auxiliary Interstates. It is one of the shortest mainline Interstates to terminate at the same route (I-10) at either end. Apart from serving the various communities of the North Shore, I-12 acts as a long bypass of New Orleans and is heavily used as a shortcut for through traffic on I-10.

In 1993, the Louisiana State Legislature designated I-12 as the Republic of West Florida Parkway. In 2003, signs identifying the highway's official name and bearing the flag of the Republic of West Florida were erected by the Louisiana Department of Transportation and Development (DOTD) in order to highlight the unique history of Louisiana's Florida Parishes.

Louisiana is in the process of widening I-12 to three lanes in each direction in locations such as Covington and Mandeville where the Interstate is still two lanes in each direction.

Route description

Baton Rouge to Hammond
While I-10 heads to the southeast toward the New Orleans metropolitan area, I-12 proceeds eastward toward the North Shore of Lake Pontchartrain. Before leaving Baton Rouge, I-12 intersects some of its major arteries, including Louisiana Highway 3064 (LA 3064; Essen Lane) and LA 73 (Jefferson Highway) via LA 1068 (Drusilla Lane). It then passes through a cloverleaf interchange with US 61 (Airline Highway). These three exits serve several of the area's key medical and shopping centers, such as the Our Lady of the Lake Regional Medical Center and Cortana Mall. The final exit in Baton Rouge is an interchange with LA 3245 (O'Neal Lane), which serves the Ochsner Medical Center – Baton Rouge and eastern suburbs.

I-12 reaches the Amite River  later, where it enters Livingston Parish and the city of Denham Springs. I-12 skirts the southern edge of town, providing interchanges with LA 3002 (South Range Avenue) and LA 1026 (Juban Road). East of Denham springs, I-12 skirts the southern edge of Livingston Parish's only other city, Walker. The interstate's sole exit in Walker is exit 15, an interchange with LA 447.

Past Walker are smaller communities in the eastern half of the parish. Exits include: LA 63 serving Livingston (exit 22), LA 441 serving Holden (exit 29), and LA 43 serving Albany and Springfield (exit 32).

Shortly after crossing the Natalbany River into Tangipahoa Parish, I-12 intersects LA 1249, which leads to the communities of Baptist and Pumpkin Center. I-12 enters into a cloverleaf interchange  later with I-55 at the southeast corner of Hammond, the largest city in Tangipahoa Parish. I-55 heads toward Jackson, Mississippi, on the north and New Orleans on the south.  after, US 51 crosses I-12, but the two roads do not intersect. There is instead an interchange with US 51 Business, which serves downtown Hammond, as well as the city of Ponchatoula to the south.

Hammond to Slidell
East of Hammond are two rural exits in southeastern Tangipahoa Parish: LA 3158 (Airport Road) to Hammond Northshore Regional Airport and LA 445 to Robert.

Just after crossing into St. Tammany Parish, I-12 curves to the southeast and begins to parallel the North Shore of Lake Pontchartrain. An interchange with LA 1077 serves the town of Madisonville to the south. The following exit, an interchange with LA 21, also connects to Madisonville as well as the parish seat of Covington to the north. Immediately before crossing the Tchefuncte River, an exit to Pinnacle Parkway and East Brewster Road serves the growing shopping area east of LA 21.

 east of the bridge, I-12 passes through an interchange with US 190 between Covington and Mandeville. This section of US 190 serves as St. Tammany Parish's busiest north–south thoroughfare, connecting Covington and surrounding points with the Lake Pontchartrain Causeway, a  bridge leading to New Orleans. Further exits in St. Tammany Parish west of Slidell include LA 59 to Mandeville and Abita Springs, LA 1088 to LA 36, and LA 434 to Lacombe.

At this exit, I-12 enters the northern edge of Slidell. An interchange with US 11 connects to the downtown area. Less than  later, I-12 reaches its eastern terminus at a major interchange with I-10 and I-59 at the northeast corner of town. From this interchange, I-10 heads southwest toward New Orleans and east toward Bay St. Louis, Mississippi, while I-59 heads north toward Hattiesburg, Mississippi.

History
I-12 was added to the highway system on October 17, 1957, with I-12 running from I-10 in Baton Rouge to I-59 north of Slidell. By the mid-1960s, the routes had been realigned to their current configuration, with I-12 and I-59 both ending at I-10 near Slidell. The route was opened to traffic in several sections between January 1967 and June 1976.

With major damage to the I-10 Twin Span Bridge across Lake Pontchartrain from Hurricane Katrina, I-12 was temporarily functioning as I-10 between Baton Rouge and Slidell. On October 14, 2005, the eastbound span of I-10 over Lake Pontchartrain reopened to two-way traffic. The westbound span of I-10 reopened on January 6, 2006, with speed, weight and size restrictions, relieving I-12 of much of the congestion that was clogging it from the Lake Pontchartrain Causeway to the junction with I-10 and I-59.

Since 2012, the DOTD has been widening the Interstate from four lanes to six lanes to accommodate the increasing amount of traffic and make the section safer. The I-10/I-12/I-59 split, notorious for rough pavement, was repaved in 2015.

Exit list

See also

References

External links

 La DOTD State, District, and Parish Maps

12
12
Transportation in East Baton Rouge Parish, Louisiana
Transportation in Livingston Parish, Louisiana
Transportation in St. Tammany Parish, Louisiana
Transportation in Tangipahoa Parish, Louisiana